Tracy Little (born November 26, 1985 in Pointe-Claire, Quebec, Canada) is a Canadian synchronized swimmer.

Career
Little won two Pan American Games medals in the team event, a silver in 2007 and a gold in 2011. Little competed for Canada in the women's team event at the 2008 and 2012 Summer Olympics, both times coming in fourth place. After the latter games, Tracy announced her retirement from competitive sport.

Honours
In 2012 Little was a recipient of the Queen Elizabeth II Diamond Jubilee Medal.

References 

Living people
1985 births
People from Pointe-Claire
Sportspeople from Quebec
Synchronized swimmers at the 2007 Pan American Games
Synchronized swimmers at the 2008 Summer Olympics
Synchronized swimmers at the 2011 Pan American Games
Olympic synchronized swimmers of Canada
Synchronized swimmers at the 2012 Summer Olympics
World Aquatics Championships medalists in synchronised swimming
Synchronized swimmers at the 2011 World Aquatics Championships
Synchronized swimmers at the 2009 World Aquatics Championships
Canadian synchronized swimmers
Pan American Games gold medalists for Canada
Pan American Games medalists in synchronized swimming
Medalists at the 2011 Pan American Games